The Arab Baths of Jaén are a well-preserved historic hammam (Islamic bathhouse) located in Jaén, Spain. The bathhouse dates from the 11th century during the Taifa or late Caliphal period, but may have undergone later alterations, probably in the 12th century. It is one of the largest known examples of Andalusi bathhouses, and is distinguished from others by its particularly large "warm room" (bayt al-wasti). 

Following the Christian conquest of the city by Ferdinand III in 1246, the baths remained in use for a while until they were repurposed as tanneries. In the 16th century Don Fernando de Torres y Portugal (Count of Villardompardo and Viceroy of Peru) built himself a private palace on top of the baths, thus hiding them for centuries. They were only definitively rediscovered by Enrique Romero de Torres in 1913 during a survey of historic buildings in the city. Archeological studies later followed and the site was declared a Cultural Heritage Property of Spain in 1931. Today it is open to visitors as a historical attraction as part of the Palacio de Villardompardo.

See also 

 Caliphal Baths
 El Bañuelo
 Moorish architecture
 ghusl (Islamic ablutions)

References 

Buildings and structures in Jaén, Spain
Former public baths
Public baths in Spain
Public baths in the Arab world
Architecture of the Taifas